CT&T United (Hangul:씨티엔티) is a manufacturer of battery electric vehicles including the eZone Medium Speed Vehicle and cZone low-speed vehicle based in South Korea. The CT&T eZone is the only electric vehicle of its type to pass the international crash test for passenger vehicles.

American assembly
CT&T United plans a "Regional Assembly and Sales" system, in which regional joint ventures in the United States would assemble cars in small factories.
On September 28, 2009 Governor of Pennsylvania Ed Rendell announced the first two such sites would be in Pennsylvania.  On May 7, 2010, the company and Governor of Hawaii Linda Lingle announced they would build a plant on the island of Oahu to manufacture up to 10,000 vehicles a year.

Distributing in Japan
e-Zone is imported by Autorex, distributed by NAFCA (Nippon Automobile Fair Certificate Association). In Japan, eZone is classified under Kei car.
Autorex corp.(Japanese)
NAFCA e-Zone website(Japanese)

Model Gallery

References

External links

 CT&T United web site  (Redirects to domain for sale)

Battery electric vehicle manufacturers
South Korean brands
Car manufacturers of South Korea
Vehicle manufacturing companies established in 2002
Kei cars
Electric vehicle manufacturers of South Korea